Giovanni Paolo Marincola (died 1588) was a Roman Catholic prelate who served as Bishop of Teano (1575–1588).

Biography
On 18 September 1575, Giovanni Paolo Marincola was appointed by Pope Gregory XIII as Bishop of Teano.
On 4 March 1576, he was ordained a bishop by Giulio Antonio Santorio, Cardinal-Priest of San Bartolomeo all’Isola, with Giovanni Antonio Facchinetti de Nuce, Bishop Emeritus of Nicastro, and Giovanni Placido, Bishop of Sessa Aurunca, serving as co-consecrators. 
He served as Bishop of Teano until his death in 1588.

While bishop, he was the principal consecrator of Sasbout Vosmeer, Vicar Apostolic to the Dutch Mission and Titular Bishop of Philippi (1602).

References

External links and additional sources
 (for Chronology of Bishops) 
 (for Chronology of Bishops) 

16th-century Italian Roman Catholic bishops
1588 deaths
Bishops appointed by Pope Gregory XIII